Sumner Schools may refer to:

 Sumner County Schools, a school district in Sumner County, Tennessee, United States
 Sumner School District, a school district in Pierce County, Washington, United States
 Charles Sumner School, established in 1872, one of the earliest schools for African Americans in Washington, D.C.

See also 
 Sumner High School (disambiguation) 
 Sumner Elementary School
 Van Asch College, formerly Sumner School for the Deaf
 Abbe Creek School, formerly Sumner School